Geoffrey de Mandeville is the name of several important medieval English barons:
Geoffrey de Mandeville (11th century) (died 1100), during the reign of William the Conqueror
Geoffrey de Mandeville, 1st Earl of Essex (died 1144), son of William de Mandeville and grandson of Geoffrey de Mandeville, become an outlaw during The Anarchy
Geoffrey de Mandeville, 2nd Earl of Essex (died 1166), one of three sons of the 1st Earl
Geoffrey FitzGeoffrey de Mandeville, 2nd Earl of Essex (1191–1216), opponent of King John of England
Geoffrey de Mandeville (c. 1070 – c. 1119), Sheriff of Devon from 1100, and baron of Marshwood

See also 
Mandeville (disambiguation)